The 2011–12 Lithuanian Hockey League season was the 21st season of the Lithuanian Hockey League, the top level of ice hockey in Lithuania. Six teams participated in the league, and ESSM Energija Elektrenai won the championship.

Regular season

External links 
 Lithuanian Ice Hockey Federation
 Season on eurohockey.com

Lith
Lithuania Hockey League seasons
2011–12 in Lithuanian ice hockey